Christian William Hansez (6 May 1910 – 6 June 1983) was a Belgian bobsledder who competed in the early 1930s. He finished tenth in the two-man event at the 1932 Winter Olympics in Lake Placid, New York.

References
1932 bobsleigh two-man results
Photo showing Hansez on right
Christian Hansez's profile at Sports Reference.com

Belgian male bobsledders
Olympic bobsledders of Belgium
Bobsledders at the 1932 Winter Olympics
1910 births
1983 deaths